The Battle of Cape Girardeau was a military demonstration of the American Civil War, occurring on April 26, 1863 in Cape Girardeau, Missouri. The conflict was part of the pursuit of US Brigadier General John McNeil through Southeast Missouri by Confederate Brigadier General John S. Marmaduke. Though the conflict to this day is known as a battle, it was a relatively small engagement whose primary importance was as the turning point that brought General Marmaduke's second Missouri raid to an end.

Background
General Marmaduke began his second raid into Missouri from Northeast Arkansas on April 18, 1863. During the raid, he intended to obtain much-needed supplies for his troops, several hundred of whom were unarmed and un-mounted. The General feared that if left behind his unarmed troops might desert, but if taken along they may be supplied with arms and horses as captured during the raid.

Marmaduke organized his division of about 5,000 men into two columns, each made up of two brigades. Colonel George W. Carter led one of the columns, which consisted of a brigade led by Colonel Colton Greene and the other by Carter himself. The second column was led by Colonel Joseph O. Shelby and consisted of Shelby's famous "Iron Brigade," commanded by Colonel George W. Thompson, and another brigade commanded by Colonel John Q. Burbridge. In all, the division had between eight and ten pieces of artillery.

General Marmaduke ordered Colonel Carter's column to advance toward Bloomfield, Missouri and attempt to capture the Federal garrison there under the command of US Brigadier General John McNeil. If McNeil had been able to escape, the Confederates thought that he would head north to Pilot Knob, the Union headquarters of the region. Thus Marmaduke accompanied Colonel Shelby's column north to Fredericktown to intercept such an attempt. Shelby's column arrived at Fredericktown on April 22, 1863, but Carter's column did not reach Bloomfield until April 23 because of difficulty crossing the Mingo swamps. Carter arrived at Bloomfield to find that McNeil had left it in ruins two days earlier. Having learned of Marmaduke's position on the road to Pilot Knob, McNeil disobeyed his orders to retreat to Pilot Knob and instead fled northeast to heavily fortified Cape Girardeau, arriving on the evening of April 24.

Carter had been instructed not to pursue McNeil if he fled in any direction other than the road to Fredericktown and Pilot Knob. However, Carter also disobeyed orders and indeed pursued McNeil to within four miles of Cape Girardeau, arriving mid-day on April 25. Carter then sent a letter to McNeil demanding the garrison's surrender and a reply within 30 minutes. The letter was signed by Confederate Major General Sterling Price with the hope that his name would instill fear in McNeil that General Price was nearby. However, McNeil was confident in the strength of his defense and refused to surrender. Fearing an attack, Carter sent word of the situation to General Marmaduke, who then proceeded with Colonel Shelby's column to reinforce Carter's troops in any possible actions at Cape Girardeau.

Fortifications
In 1861 General Ulysses S. Grant approved the construction of four forts at strategic locations around the city of Cape Girardeau. They were named Forts A, B, C, and D. Fort A was positioned on a bluff overlooking the Mississippi River at the north edge of town and was meant to defend the city against Confederate gunboats on the river. Fort B was located on a hill now occupied by Southeast Missouri State University and was built to protect the city from enemy approaches on the Perryville Road and Jackson Road (now Broadway Avenue). Fort C was near the present intersection of South Ellis Street and Good Hope Street and guarded approaches on the Bloomfield Road, Gordonville Road (now Independence Street), and Commerce Road (now Sprigg Street).

Fort D was located on a river bluff south of the city, and like Fort A, it was primarily a river defense. It was the largest and most important garrison in the region and is the only fort remaining in Cape Girardeau today. However, Fort D did not play an important role in the Battle of Cape Girardeau.

Action

On the night of April 25, in anticipation of the attack, General McNeil ordered the evacuation of women and children via steamboat to a safe location upriver. Also during the night two gunboats and a steamer arrived with additional troops to support McNeil's forces. With the gunboats in place McNeil did not foresee any threat from the Mississippi River side of the city, so he had cannons moved from Forts A and D along the river to Forts B and C on the western side of the city. In all, McNeil's forces totaled about 4,000 men, including supporting regiments from Iowa, Wisconsin, Nebraska, and Illinois, though some of these regiments may have arrived after the action had ended.

Shelby's column arrived at Cape Girardeau early on April 26. With General Marmaduke's full division then on the western edge of the city, it assumed a formation that consisted of Colonel Burbridge's brigade in the center, Shelby's on the left, and Carter's on the right. The line extended from just east of St. Mary's Cemetery on the north (near the present intersection of Missouri Ave and Mississippi St) to Gordonville Road on the south. Its center was on the Jackson Road.

The attack began around 10:00 am on April 26. Unsuccessful charges were made by cavalry units from both sides, the Federal troops being driven back by Colonel Shelby's superior cavalry forces and the Confederates being met with heavy fire from field artillery and the guns of Forts B and C. The artillery fire between the forts and Shelby's Brigade made up the bulk of the action. The fighting lasted approximately four to five hours, ceasing sometime after 2:00 pm when General Marmaduke ordered his forces to withdraw.

Aftermath
No reliable reports were made of the numbers killed and wounded during the action, as "official" figures tended to be exaggerated and unfounded. The number of confirmed dead was no more than ten on either side, though some reports claim that the total number killed was close to a hundred, plus over three hundred wounded.

Following the conflict, General Marmaduke retreated to Jackson and then led his troops back to Arkansas, bringing to an end his second Missouri raid. Marmaduke was followed by Federal forces, but no contact was made before crossing the Arkansas border. Possibly as punishment for disobeying orders and instigating the needless conflict at Cape Girardeau, Colonel Carter was demoted to commanding a brigade rather than his entire column.

Though neither side had a clear victory at the closing of the day's fighting, the battle was a strategic Union victory that forced the Confederate forces to retreat to Arkansas.

Historian Henry Phillips concluded, "while it was not of sufficient magnitude to be termed a battle in technical military parlance, all of the potentials were present for a sanguinary battle, and the reason a battle did not occur was because the commanders of the two hostile forces each had reasons that he deemed sufficient for not forcing the issue."

Forces

Confederate order of battle
Brigadier General John S. Marmaduke (5,086 men, 8 guns)

Notes
Footnotes

Citations

References

"Anniversary Observed of Battle of Cape Girardeau in Civil War." Source unknown. May, 1939. Clippings Collection, Special Collections and Archives, Kent Library, Southeast Missouri State University.
"April 26th was Anniversary of Cape Girardeau Battle." The Community. April, 1930. Clippings Collection, Special Collections and Archives, Kent Library, Southeast Missouri State University.
Bartels, Carolyn M. The Civil War in Missouri Day by Day 1861-1865. Shawnee Mission, KS: Two Trails Publishing. 1992.
"Civil War Battle at Cape Occurred 89 Years Ago." Source Unknown. April 25, 1952. Condensed version of article from book Authentic Accounts of the Great Civil War by John Laird Wilson. Glenn House Collection, Box 3079, Folder 10, Special Collections and Archives, Kent Library, Southeast Missouri State University.
Dickerson, J.D. "The Civil War in Cape Girardeau: Marmaduke Heads North." Southeast Missourian. Sep. 23, 1961. Clippings Collection, Special Collections and Archives, Kent Library, Southeast Missouri State University.
Dittlinger, Ann. "Battle of Cape Girardeau (A Missourian Bicentennial Feature)." Southeast Missourian. April 18 and April 25, 1976. Glenn House Collection, Box 3079, Folder 10, Special Collections and Archives, Kent Library, Southeast Missouri State University.
Guilbert. "Marmaduke-McNeil Fight for Cape Girardeau." Southeast Missourian. April 25, 1963. Reprint of New York Tribune article dated May 1, 1863. Clippings Collection, Special Collections and Archives, Kent Library, Southeast Missouri State University. 
Hill, Dr. Robert R. "Fort D Old Stronghold (A Missourian Bicentennial Feature)." Southeast Missourian. Sep. 7, 1975. Glenn House Collection, Box 3079, Folder 11, Special Collections and Archives, Kent Library, Southeast Missouri State University.
Hinchey, Allan. "Battle of Cape Girardeau in Civil War was Fought 69 Years Ago Today." Source unknown. April 26, 1932. Clippings Collection, Special Collections and Archives, Kent Library, Southeast Missouri State University.
"Historical Points: Civil War Forts". Southeast Missourian. July 9, 1951. Clippings Collection, Special Collections and Archives, Kent Library, Southeast Missouri State University.
Maple, Rev. J.C. "Markaduke's Attack on Cape Girardeau." The Republican. April 26, 1913. Clippings Collection, Special Collections and Archives, Kent Library, Southeast Missouri State University.
"Marmaduke Shell Found in Well Near the Fair Ground." The Republican. Date unknown. Clippings Collection, Special Collections and Archives, Kent Library, Southeast Missouri State University.
McNeil, Brigadier General John. "Boats to go for troops." April 26, 1863. St. Louis Civil War Roundtable Collection, Box 1663, Folder 4, Item 9, Special Collections and Archives, Kent Library, Southeast Missouri State University.
McNeil, Brigadier General John. "Funds Removed." General Order No. 9. April 26, 1863. St. Louis Civil War Roundtable Collection, Box 1663, Folder 4, Item 10, Special Collections and Archives, Kent Library, Southeast Missouri State University.
McNeil, Brigadier General John. "Women to Leave." General Orders No. [blank]. April 25, 1863. St. Louis Civil War Roundtable Collection, Box 1663, Folder 4, Item 8, Special Collections and Archives, Kent Library, Southeast Missouri State University.
Murdoch, Lindsey W. Lindsey W. Murdoch Reminiscences. Date unknown. p 158. Lindsey W. Murdoch Reminiscences, Special Collections and Archives, Kent Library, Southeast Missouri State University.  

Oates, Stephen B. "Union Artillery Routs Southern Attack on Cape Girardeau.", Southeast Missourian. April 27, 1963. Reprint of article from Missouri Historical Review. Glenn House Collection, Box 3079, Folder 10, Special Collections and Archives, Kent Library, Southeast Missouri State University.
"Old Letters Found in Belfast", Southeast Missourian. June 3, 1950. Clippings Collection, Special Collections and Archives, Kent Library, Southeast Missouri State University.
Phillips, Henry M. "The Battle of Cape Girardeau: A Civil War Encounter." Southeast Missourian. April 26–30, 1956. Clippings Collection, Special Collections and Archives, Kent Library, Southeast Missouri State University.
Ponder, Jerry. The Battle of Chalk Bluff: An Account of General John S. Marmaduke's Second Missouri Raid. Doniphan, MO: Ponder Books. 1994.
Snider, Felix E. & Earl Augustus Collins. Cape Girardeau: Biography of a City. Cape Girardeau, MO: Ramfre Press. 1956.
Webb, William L. Battles and Biographies of Missourians; or, The Civil War Period of Our State. Kansas City, MO: Hudson-Kimberly. 1900.
 National Park Service Battle Summary
 CWSAC Report Update

Collections

1863 in Missouri
1863 in the United States
Cape Girardeau
Cape Girardeau County, Missouri
Battle of Cape Girardeau
Cape Girardeau
Cape Girardeau
Cape Girardeau
Cape Girardeau
April 1863 events